Ben Franklin Caldwell (August 2, 1848 – December 29, 1924) was a U.S. Representative from Illinois.

Born near Carrollton, Illinois, Caldwell moved to Illinois in April 1853 with his parents, who settled near Chatham, Illinois. He attended the public schools, and thereafter engaged in agricultural pursuits. He served as member of the Board of Supervisors of Sangamon County in 1877 and 1878. He served as member of the Illinois House of Representatives 1882-1886, and served in the Illinois Senate 1890-1894.

Upon his election to Congress in 1898, he resigned the presidency of the Farmers' National Bank of Springfield, which office he had held since 1885. He also served as president of the Caldwell State Bank of Chatham.

Caldwell was elected as a Democrat to the Fifty-sixth, Fifty-seventh, and Fifty-eighth Congresses (March 4, 1899 – March 3, 1905). He was an unsuccessful candidate for reelection in 1904 to the Fifty-ninth Congress.

Caldwell was elected to the Sixtieth Congress (March 4, 1907 – March 3, 1909). He was not a candidate for renomination in 1908. He again engaged in banking in Chatham, Illinois. He died in Springfield, Illinois, on December 29, 1924.  He was interred in Oak Ridge Cemetery.

References

1848 births
1924 deaths
Democratic Party members of the Illinois House of Representatives
Democratic Party Illinois state senators
People from Sangamon County, Illinois
American bankers
Burials at Oak Ridge Cemetery
Democratic Party members of the United States House of Representatives from Illinois
People from Carrollton, Illinois